Grooms Tavern Complex is a historic tavern located at Grooms Corners in Saratoga County, New York.  The complex consists of the tavern, a wagon and blacksmith shop, and a frame privy.  The tavern building was built about 1825 and is a 2-story, timber-framed, gable-roofed building in a vernacular Federal style.  It consists of a main block with -story, frame kitchen wing in the rear.  When expanded to two stories in the 1840s, a Greek Revival style cornice was added. The building was partially remodeled in the late 19th and early 20th centuries. The tavern building was also operated as a general store. The wagon and blacksmith shop was constructed in the 1840s and is a 2-story, rectangular, timber-framed building with a gable roof in the Greek Revival style.

It was listed on the National Register of Historic Places in 2000.

References

Federal architecture in New York (state)
Greek Revival architecture in New York (state)
Buildings and structures in Saratoga County, New York
Taverns in New York (state)
National Register of Historic Places in Saratoga County, New York
Taverns on the National Register of Historic Places in New York (state)
Blacksmith shops